Vreni Stöckli (born 1953) is a Swiss paralympic alpine skier. She represented Switzerland in three Paralympic Winter Games, winner of two silver medals and one bronze medal.

Career 
At the 1994 Winter Paralympics, in Lillehammer, Stöckli placed third in the slalom race category LWX-XII1, with 2:40.71, behind the Americans Sarah Will with a time of 2:14.56 and Kelley Fox with 2:27.24. She won a silver medal in the giant slalom  with a time of 3:25.64. On the podium, was compatriot Gerda Pamler winning gold, in 3:12.39, and  French Stephanie Riche winning bronze in 3:27.20.

At the 1998 Winter Paralympic Games in Nagano, Stöckli placed 2nd in giant slalom, finishing the race in 2:57.68, behind Sarah Will in 2:35.09; and ahead of Kuniko Obinata in 2:58.97.

At the 2002 Paralympic Winter Games in Salt Lake City, Vreni Stöckli finished sixth in the giant slalom category LW10-11, with a time of 2:55.95, and she was eighth in the super-G LW10-12, with a time of 1:30.72.

References 

1953 births
Living people
Paralympic alpine skiers of Switzerland
Swiss female alpine skiers
Alpine skiers at the 1994 Winter Paralympics
Alpine skiers at the 1998 Winter Paralympics
Alpine skiers at the 2002 Winter Paralympics
Medalists at the 1994 Winter Paralympics
Medalists at the 1998 Winter Paralympics
Paralympic silver medalists for Switzerland
Paralympic bronze medalists for Switzerland